Dunmaglass is a shooting estate of about  in the Monadhliath Mountains of Scotland. It was owned by property developer Sir Jack Arnold Hayward (deceased 2015), former chairman of Wolverhampton Wanderers F.C. Dunmaglass is known for shooting of pheasant, grouse, duck and sometimes hare. Dunmaglass is also the historical seat of Clan MacGillivray.

Wind power
A single wind turbine was constructed on the estate in the 1990s, close to the summit of Beinn Dubhcharaidh. It has since been shut down. In 2005, Renewable Energy Systems (RES) proposed a 36-turbine wind farm on the Dunmaglass estate. Scottish Natural Heritage and the John Muir Trust objected to the proposal, referring to the potential effects on the local golden eagle population. In 2008, a revised planning application for 33 turbines was submitted to the Scottish Government. The Cairngorm National Park Authority are opposed to the wind farm, but Highland Council have come out in favour of the scheme.

References

External links
Dunmaglass Wind Farm, RES website
Stop Dunmaglass, objectors' website

Highland Estates